The Cold War: A World History is a book by Odd Arne Westad.

Themes 
The Cold War: A World History is divided into 22 chapters.

Westad is critical of both sides of the Cold War in the book.

Reception 
Ian Thomson described the work as "well-researched if occasionally bland-sounding".

References

Further reading

External links
Presentation by Westad on The Cold War at The Wilson Center, September 8, 2017, C-SPAN

2017 non-fiction books
Allen Lane (imprint) books
English-language books
Books about the Cold War